Wajdi Mouawad, OC, (born 1968) is a Lebanese-Canadian writer, actor, and director. He is known in Canadian and French theatre for politically engaged works such as the acclaimed play Incendies (2003). His works often revolve around family trauma, war, the betrayal of youth. Since April 2016, Mouawad has been the director of the Théâtre national de la Colline in Paris.

Early life and education 
Born in Lebanon, Mouawad's family left the country when he was eight due to the outbreak of the Lebanese Civil War. 
He moved to Montreal in 1983 after living in France for five years.

Career
In 1998, his creation Willy Protagoras enfermé dans les toilettes (Willy Protagoras locked up in the toilets) was voted best Montreal-based production by l'Association québécoise des critiques de théâtre.

From 2000 to 2004, he led the Théâtre de Quat'sous in Montreal.

In 2004 he directed and produced his first film, Littoral, based on the play of the same name.

In September 2007, he became the artistic director of the National Arts Centre's French Theatre in Ottawa, Ontario, Canada.

In early 2011, Mouawad cast French rock musician Bertrand Cantat in Chœurs, his production of a trilogy of Greek plays by Sophocles. This sparked widespread public criticism in Canada, as Cantat had recently been released after serving four years for the murder of his girlfriend, French actress Marie Trintignant. Canadian politicians suggested barring Cantat's entry into the country, as he failed to meet legal requirements for the entry of ex convicts. In April 2011 the artistic director of Théâtre du Nouveau Monde, Lorraine Pintal, announced that Cantat would not be performing in Chœurs in Canada, though he did tour with the production in France, Belgium and Switzerland. Mouawad responded to the controversy by publishing an open letter to his three-year-old daughter Aimee in the newspaper Le Devoir, arguing for Cantat's right to complete reintegration into society.

Since April 2016, Mouawad has been the director of the Théâtre national de la Colline in Paris.

Work

His play Incendies (Scorched) has been produced all over the world, including the United States, Brazil, Austria, Germany, Mexico, Spain and Australia, and the 2007 production at the Tarragon Theatre in Toronto won several awards. The Vienna Burgtheater assigned Stefan Bachmann with the stage production. It subsequently received much praise from critics, winning the "Nestroy Award" in 2007. In 2011 Incendies, the film version of the play directed by Denis Villeneuve was Canada's official selection for the Academy Awards.

Playwright
Published
1996: Alphonse (Leméac)
1999: Les mains d'Edwige au moment de la naissance (Leméac)
1999, 2009: Littoral (coedition Leméac/Actes Sud-Papiers)
2000: Pacamambo (Actes Sud-Papiers Junior)
2002: Rêves (coedition Leméac/Actes Sud-Papiers)
2003: Incendies; English translation: Scorched (2009)
2004: Willy Protagoras enfermé dans les toilettes (Leméac)
2006: Forêts; English translation: Forests (2010)
2007: Assoiffés (coédition Leméac/Actes Sud-Papiers)
2008: Le soleil ni la mort ne peuvent se regarder en face (coedition Leméac/Actes Sud)
2008: Seuls – Chemin, texte et peintures (Actes Sud – Leméac)
2009: Ciels; English translation: Heavens (2014)
2011: Journée de noces chez les Cromagnons (coedition Leméac/Actes Sud-Papiers)
2015: Sœurs
2017: Victoires
2018: L'œil
2018: Tous des oiseaux; English translation: Birds of a kind (2019)
2019: Alphonse ou Les aventures extraordinaires de Pierre-Paul-René, un enfant doux, monocorde et qui ne s'étonne jamais de rien
Not published
1992: Partie de cache-cache entre 2 tchécoslovaques au début du siècle

Radio works 
 Loin des chaises
 Wilfrid
 William M.
 Le chevalier
 Dans la cathédrale
 Les trains hurlent quand on tue
 Les étrangers du bord du monde

Novels
2002: Visage retrouvé (coedition Leméac/Actes Sud)
2007: Un obus dans le cœur (Actes Sud Junior – Léméac)
2012: Anima

Films
2004: Tideline (Littoral) directed by Wajdi Mouawad
2010: Incendies directed by Denis Villeneuve

Theatre Directing
(authors in parenthesis, unless authored by Wajdi Moawad)
1992: Al Malja et L'Exil (Naji Mouawad)
1992: Macbeth (Shakespeare)
1994: Le tour du monde of Joe Maquillon (Gislain Bouchard)
1995: Tu ne violeras pas (Edna Mazia)
1995: Don Quichotte (Miguel de Cervantes)
1997: Littoral1998: Willy Protagoras enfermé dans les toilettes1998: Trainspotting (Irvine Welsh)
1998: Œdipe roi, in English Oedipus Rex (Sophocles)
1999: Disco Pigs (Enda Walsh)
1999: Les Troyennes, in English The Trojan Women (Euripides)
1999: Littoral – Festival d'Avignon
2000: Rêves2000: Ce n'est pas la manière dont on se l'imagine que Claude et Jacqueline se sont rencontrés (Mouawad co-authoring with Estelle Clareton)
2000: Lulu le chant souterrain (Frank Wedekind)
2000: Reading Hebron (Jason Sherman)
2001: Le mouton et la baleine (Ahmed Ghazali)
2001: Six personnages en quête d'auteur in English Six Characters in Search of an Author (Luigi Pirandello)
2001: Manuscrit retrouvé à Saragosse (opera, Alexis Nouss)
2002: Les Trois Sœurs in English Three Sisters (Anton Chekhov)
2003: Incendies
2005: Ma mère chien (Louise Bombardier)
2006: Forêts
2007: Incendies in Russian, at Théâtre Et Cetera Moscou)
2008: Seuls at Festival d'Avignon
2009: Littoral, Incendies, Forêts (trilogy) at Festival d'Avignon
2009: Ciels at Festival d'Avignon
2010: Ciels at Odéon-Théâtre de l'Europe Ateliers Berthier
2010: Littoral / Incendies / Forêts (trilogy) at Théâtre national de Chaillot
2010: Seuls at Festival d'Avignon
2011: Seuls at Le Quartz
2011: Temps at Théâtre d'Aujourd'hui
2011: Le Cycle des Femmes: trois histoires de Sophocle at Festival d'Avignon (music by Bertrand Cantat and Pascal Humbert)

Adaptations
He has adapted different works for the theatre, from Don Quixote to Trainspotting. 
2010: Un tramway d'après adaptation of A Streetcar Named Desire of Tennessee Williams (directed by Krzysztof Warlikowski, Théâtre de l'Odéon)

Interpretations
2009: Seuls texte (directing and interpreting, Festival d'Avignon)
2010: Les Justes of Albert Camus (directed by Stanislas Nordey, Théâtre national de Bretagne, Théâtre national de la Colline, Théâtre des Treize Vents, Théâtre National Populaire -Villeurbanne)

Others
2004: Je suis le méchant!, interviews with André Brassard (Leméac)
2004: Littoral, cinematic projection of the theater work of the same name TVA Films
2005: Architecture d'un marcheur, interviews given to Jean-François Côté (Leméac)
2009: Le Sang des Promesses: Puzzle, racines, et rhizomes, travel notes, directing, regarding the process of writing and directing of the de la tetralogy (Léméac/Actes Sud)
2011: Traduire Sophocle (Actes Sud)

Awards and distinctions
1998: Prize of best production in Montréal, awarded by "Association québécoise des critiques de théâtre" for Willy Protagoras enfermé dans les toilettes
2000: Literary prize of the Governor General of Canada in the Theater category for Littoral
2002: Chevalier (knight) of the Ordre des Arts et des Lettres awarded by France for the collection of his works. 
2004: Prix Jacqueline-Déry-Mochon
2004: Prize "SACD de la francophonie" for totality of his works
2005: Molière of best francophone author (he refused to receive the Molières 2005 prize)
2009: Officer Order of Canada "for his contributions as a writer, actor, stage director and playwright known internationally for the quality and scope of his theatrical creations".
2009: Grand prix du théâtre de l'Académie française
2013: Phoenix Award for his novel Anima (as part of the Beirut Spring Festival organized by the Samir Kassir Foundation)
2013: Grand Prix Thyde Monnier for Anima
2013: Deuxième Roman de Laval prize for Anima
2013: Prix Méditerranée for Anima
2014: Premi Llibreter de Narrativa for Anima

Sources
Charlotte Farcet, Les Tigres de Wajdi Mouawad (Joca Seria, 2009)

References

External links
Wajdi Mouawad A biography
Critical bibliography (Auteurs.contemporain.info)
 Vienna Burgtheater Play Info

1968 births
Living people
20th-century Canadian dramatists and playwrights
21st-century Canadian dramatists and playwrights
Writers from Montreal
Film directors from Montreal
Lebanese emigrants to Canada
Governor General's Award-winning dramatists
National Theatre School of Canada alumni
Male actors from Montreal
Officers of the Order of Canada
Canadian dramatists and playwrights in French
Canadian male dramatists and playwrights
20th-century Canadian male writers
21st-century Canadian male writers